Breadwinners is an American animated television series produced by Nickelodeon. A preview of the series, marketed as a "sneak beak", aired on February 17, 2014. The series began airing in its regular timeslot on February 22, 2014.

On May 8, 2014, it was announced that the series had been picked up for a second season of 20 episodes.

Series overview

Episodes

Pilot (2012)

Season 1 (2014–15)

Season 2 (2015–16)

Notes

References

Breadwinners
Breadwinners